Village Roadshow Limited is an Australian company which operates cinemas and theme parks, and produces and distributes films. Before being acquired by private equity company BGH Capital, the company was listed on the Australian Securities Exchange and majority owned by Village Roadshow Corporation, with members of founder Roc Kirby's family in the top roles.

History 
Village Roadshow originally started operations as Village Drive-Ins (later known as "Village Drive-ins and Cinemas" before becoming today's "Village Cinemas" brand), in 1954, when founder Roc Kirby began running one of Australia's first drive-in cinemas in the Melbourne suburb of Croydon. The drive-in was adjacent to a shopping strip called "Croydon Village"; hence the company adopted the "Village" name. The company later expanded into traditional cinemas in major areas, though it still operates the Coburg Drive-In in Coburg, Melbourne.

In the 1960s, the company expanded to start its film distribution business (once a 50-50 joint venture with Greater Union) and moved into film production in the 1970s. The original cinema chain now became one of several businesses the company was involved in.

In the 1980s, Village Roadshow was one of the leading forces in creating state of the art multiplex cinema complexes. Innovations brought in during this period included using stadium-style seating, sophisticated sound systems and the latest in projection technologies. The cinemas of that era were the forerunners to the multiplexes of today. It was expanded ibn 1987 when it signed a partnership with rival cinema chain Greater Union to see 200 screens expanded to their circuits by 1990 and having both companies to develop $100 million in their equipment.

The venture was expanded in September 1987 when Roadshow and Greater Union agreed to combine the existing Roadshow Distributors theatrical branch with Greater Union's own theatrical branch, Greater Union Film Distributors to set up new separate-branding labels, Roadshow Greater Union Distributors and Greater Union Distributors, and RGUD continue to handle the existing suppliers, which included Warner Bros, Orion Pictures and New World Pictures.

In 1988, Village Roadshow took over De Laurentiis Entertainment Group, which brought on a change of name: Village Roadshow Limited. This allowed the company to raise more capital to fund further expansion.

In the 1990s, the company diversified into complementary media and entertainment businesses. This included the purchase and development of theme parks, the purchase and integration of the Triple M and Today radio networks to create Austereo, the creation of Roadshow Music, the creation of Village Roadshow Pictures, and the commencement of a co-production deal with Warner Bros.

Village Roadshow has scaled back its international cinema markets to Australia and Singapore. The company merged its Village Roadshow Pictures arm with Concord Music Group to form a Los Angeles-based diversified entertainment division, Village Roadshow Entertainment Group.

In 2003, the company formed a joint venture, Australian Theatres, with Amalgamated Holdings Limited, owners of Greater Union and several other cinema brands. The original founding business, Village Cinemas, is part of the joint venture.

In 2008, Village Roadshow and Concord Music Group, co-owned by television producer Norman Lear, said they had completed a merger forming a new company to exploit their film and music assets. Investors in the new company include Lambert Entertainment and private equity firms Tailwind Capital Partners and Clarity Partners. However, on 25 March 2013, Wood Creek Capital led investor group purchased Concord Music Group from Village Roadshow Entertainment Group.

In late 2019, company veteran Graham Burke stepped down as CEO and became a non-executive director, with Clark Kirby his successor as CEO.

In 2020, Village Roadshow was in talks with private equity firm BGH Capital about a takeover offer. The offer was lowered after the COVID-19 pandemic closed theme parks and cinemas.

Assets

Current 
 Roadshow Television
 Roadshow Rough Diamond (joint venture with John Edwards)
 BLINK TV (unscripted production company)
 Australian Theatres (joint venture with Event Hospitality & Entertainment) 
 Village Cinemas (the original business)
 Event Cinemas
 Greater Union
 Birch, Carrol & Coyle
 Roadshow Entertainment
 Roadshow Films
 FilmNation Entertainment (31%, May 2020)
 Village Roadshow Entertainment Group (20%, May 2020) 
 Village Roadshow Pictures Entertainment
 Village Roadshow Pictures
 Perfect Village Entertainment (China) (joint venture with Perfect World Pictures and WME-IMG China)
 Village Roadshow Pictures Asia
 Village Roadshow Television
 Reel Corporation
 Reel DVD
 Vine Alternative Investments
 Lakeshore Entertainment
 Qualia Libraries
 Rysher Entertainment
 Bing Crosby Productions library
 TPE catalog
 Gaylord Films
 Pandora Films
 Trans Atlantic Entertainment library
 Village Roadshow Theme Parks
 Australian Outback Spectacular
 Paradise Country
 Sea World
 Sea World Resort & Water Park
 Warner Bros. Movie World (joint venture with Warner Bros. Discovery)
 Wet'n'Wild (joint venture with CNL Lifestyle Properties)
 Wet'n'Wild Las Vegas
 Wet'n'Wild Gold Coast
 Village Roadshow Studios
 Village Roadshow Marketing Solutions
 Edge
 Edge Consumer
 Opia
 Lifestyle Rewards
 Village Films Greece
 Roadshow Music
 Concord Music
 Golden Village
 Golden Village Pictures

Former 

 Austereo
 Flying Bark Productions

See also 

 List of film production companies
 List of television production companies
 Cinema of Australia

References

External links 
 Village Roadshow corporate site

Companies based in Melbourne
Companies formerly listed on the Australian Securities Exchange
Entertainment companies established in 1954
Film production companies of Australia
1954 establishments in Australia